Iga penyet is Indonesian Eastern Javanese cuisine — fried beef spare ribs served with spicy sambal terasi. The fried beef ribs is squeezed against a mortar filled with sambal, and  usually served with lalab vegetables and steamed rice. It was first popular in East Javanese Surabaya city, and now has spread across Indonesia.

Etymology
In Indonesian iga means ribs, while the term penyet in Javanese means "to squeeze", which refer to the serving method of squeezing the meat against mortar filled with spicy sambal using pestle. This penyet method of serving dishes is also applied to numbers of other dishes, such as empal penyet, ayam penyet (ayam goreng penyet) and ayam bakar penyet.

See also

 Ayam penyet
 Javanese cuisine

References

External links
 Iga penyet recipe
 Iga penyet recipe 

Javanese cuisine
Penyet